The Quill/Boven National Park comprises two separated sections of protected land at opposite ends of the island of Sint Eustatius in the Dutch Caribbean. Both parts of the park have been identified by BirdLife International as Important Bird Areas (IBAs) because they support populations of several threatened or restricted-range bird species. 
 
The Boven IBA is a 1,016 ha peninsula of dry, rocky hills lying at the north-western end of the island. Its birds include a nesting colony of 100–200 red-billed tropicbirds, as well as resident green-throated caribs, Caribbean elaenias, pearly-eyed thrashers and lesser Antillean bullfinches. The Quill IBA is a 470 ha site at the south-eastern end of Sint Eustatius; it is dominated by a 600 m high stratovolcano vegetated with shrubland and, within the caldera, tropical semi-evergreen forest. Additional resident birds include bridled quail-doves, purple-throated caribs, Antillean crested hummingbirds and brown tremblers. Other animals present include lesser Antillean iguanas, red-bellied racers and several species of lizards and bats.

References

Important Bird Areas of the Dutch Caribbean
Natural history of Sint Eustatius